Lyudmila Samotyosova (née , Ignatyeva; born 26 October 1939) is a Soviet athlete who competed mainly in the 100 metres.

She competed for the USSR in the 1968 Summer Olympics held in Mexico City, Mexico in the 4 x 100 metres where she won the bronze medal with her team mates Lyudmila Zharkova, Galina Bukharina and Vera Popkova.

External links
 
 

1939 births
Soviet female sprinters
Olympic bronze medalists for the Soviet Union
Athletes (track and field) at the 1960 Summer Olympics
Athletes (track and field) at the 1964 Summer Olympics
Athletes (track and field) at the 1968 Summer Olympics
Olympic athletes of the Soviet Union
Living people
European Athletics Championships medalists
Medalists at the 1968 Summer Olympics
Olympic bronze medalists in athletics (track and field)
Olympic female sprinters
Universiade medalists in athletics (track and field)
Universiade gold medalists for the Soviet Union